Sukhteh Luleh (also Romanized as Sūkhteh Lūleh) is a village in Pir Bazar Rural District, in the Central District of Rasht County, Gilan Province, Iran. At the 2006 census, its population was 44, in 11 families.

References 

Populated places in Rasht County